Olkowski (feminine: Olkowska, plural: Olkowscy) is a Polish surname.  Notable people with the surname include:

Paweł Olkowski (born 1990), Polish footballer
June Olkowski (born 1960), American former basketball player and coach, 2012 inductee to the National Polish-American Sports Hall of Fame

Polish-language surnames